Pixelization  (British English, pixelisation) or mosaic processing is any technique used in editing images or video, whereby an image is blurred by displaying part or all of it at a markedly lower resolution.  It is primarily used for censorship. The effect is a standard graphics filter, available in all but the most basic bitmap graphics editors.

As censorship
A familiar example of pixelization can be found in a majority of television news and documentary productions, in which vehicle license plates and faces of suspects at crime scenes are routinely obscured to maintain the presumption of innocence, such as how it appears in the television series COPS. This is especially used in Hungary and Slovakia by RTL Klub. Bystanders and others who do not sign release forms are also customarily pixelized.  Footage of nudity (including male and female genitals, buttocks, nipples, pubic hair, or areolae) is likewise obscured in some media: before the watershed in many countries, in newspapers or general magazines, or in places in which the public cannot avoid seeing the image (such as on billboards). Drug references, as well as gestures considered obscene (such as the finger) may also be censored in this manner.  Pixelization is not usually used for this purpose in films, DVDs, subscription television services, or pornography (except for countries in which the law requires it). When obscene language is censored by an audible bleep, the mouth of the speaker may be pixelized to prevent lip reading, such as in the television series COPS. Graphic injuries and excess blood may also be pixelized. Offense words that are visually visible may also be pixelized.

Pixelization may also be used to avoid unintentional product placement, or to hide elements that would date a broadcast, such as date and time stamps on home video submissions. Censorship for such purposes is most common on reality television series.

In media
Pixelization has also been used for artistic effect, notably in the art print The Wave of the Future, a reinterpretation of Katsushika Hokusai's The Great Wave off Kanagawa. In this updated print, the image of the large ocean wave shifts from the traditional style of the Japanese woodcut print to a pixelized image and finally to a wireframe model computer graphics image. Westworld (1973) was the first feature film to use digital image processing to pixelize photography to simulate an android's point of view.

Alternative techniques

A black rectangular or square box (known as censor bars) may be used to occlude parts of images completely (for example, a black bar covering the eyes instead of the entire face being pixelized). Censor bars were extensively used as a graphic device in the January 2012 protests against SOPA and PIPA.

A drawback of pixelization is that any differences between the large pixels can be exploited in moving images to reconstruct the original, unpixelized image; squinting at a pixelized, moving image can sometimes achieve a similar result. In both cases, integration of the large pixels over time allows smaller, more accurate pixels to be constructed in a still image result.  Completely obscuring the censored area with pixels of a constant color or pixels of random colors escapes this drawback but can be more aesthetically jarring.

An additional drawback, when pixelization is used to reduce the repulsing, disturbing or, more generally shocking, aspect of an image, is that all information contained in the pixelized area is lost for the audience. Other visual processing techniques can help reduce the shocking aspect of images or videos while preserving most of the information of the media.

International legal standards
Nudity is obscured on broadcast television stations in the United States. The Federal Communications Commission states it is a violation of federal law to air obscene, indecent, and profane programming at any time, especially during certain hours. Monetary penalties and revocation of licenses are issued for law breakers. Japanese pornography laws require that genitals in films (including animated works) and other forms of adult media (such as eroge, drawings, etc) be obscured. Article 175 of Penal Code (Act No.45 of 1907) still in effect today in Japan forbids any person and imprisons anyone who distributes, sells or displays in public an obscene document, drawing or other objects of such nature. In Thailand, restrictions are placed on television broadcast depiction of cigarettes being smoked, alcohol being consumed, or guns being pointed at people. Pixelization is one method of censoring this content.

In the Philippines, pixelization is also used if there are scenes of naked people or cadavers, bloody depiction of death by any means (e.g. gunshot wounds) and exposure of innards (sometimes rendered in black and white and blurred), and the finger gesture, among objectionable content.
However, nudity and some bloody scenes are cut entirely and pointing of guns or blades to oneself or others are cropped. Philippine law states production, printing, publication, importation, sale, distribution, and exhibition of obscene and pornographic material is strictly prohibited and is punishable by law.

See also
 Bleep censor
 Colour banding
 Fogging (censorship), an alternate technique
 Posterization
 Reverse video
 Tape delay (broadcasting)
 Use of pixelation in camouflage patterns such as MARPAT

References

External links 

 Facepixelizer - Online editor for pixelizing parts of an image

Censorship of broadcasting
Digital art
Self-censorship